St. Anselm's Catholic Church, Rectory and Parish Hall in Anselmo, Nebraska are three separate structures that together form the St. Anselm parish complex. The church, also known as The Cathedral of the Sandhills, was built in 1928–1929, along with the rectory; the parish hall was constructed in 1905 and served as the original church building.

The complex was listed on the National Register of Historic Places in 2008 for its Late Gothic Revival and Bungalow/Craftsman architecture.

Church

St. Anselm's Catholic Church was built in 1928–1929 in the Late Gothic Revival style. M.S. Lahr and Carl Stangel of Omaha drew the plans for the church and rectory, which were built by Leo Worth and John Brock of Columbus, although local men contributed largely to the project. The structure's exterior is covered in brick with stone details, while the foundation consists of concrete blocks. The roof, supported by steel beams, is gabled and covered in asphalt shingles.

A large arched Gothic window dominates the church's front facade. Under it are three doorways: one with double doors in the center and one on each side of it with single doors. "INTROIBO AD ALTARE DEI", which translates to "I will go to the altar of God", is carved over the central doorway, while an Alpha and an Omega are carved over the side doors.

Six pairs of arched windows with Gothic design line the sides of the structure; between them are placed engaged buttresses with limestone caps.

Inside, the ceiling rafters are visible, ending in brackets with volutes. Stained glass windows are located on the walls to the north and south of the marble altar, which was installed in 1948. The original light fixtures are present, as are the original pews. Doors in the sanctuary provide access to a room used for the vestment of the priest for Mass, and to another used as an office.

Rectory

The parish rectory, placed west of the church, was built in 1928–1929 in the Craftsman style. Like the church, it rests on a concrete block foundation and has brick exterior walls. Also like the church, the house's roof is gabled and covered with asphalt shingles. The house has two stories and a basement, with a small projection on the northwest corner. The rectory's enclosed porch has arched window and a flat roof, which doubles as a balcony for one of the second-floor bedrooms.

Dark woodwork is present throughout the eight-room interior of the building. A wooden Craftsman staircase leads to the upper story; the rectory also features a telephone nook, broad baseboards, French doors, and a built-in butler's pantry.

A wooden one-car garage stands southeast of the rectory and is a contributing building on the listing.

Parish hall

The parish hall, constructed in 1905, is the oldest building on the listing, having originally been the parish church. It was construction is typical of wooden frame halls built during the early 1900s. It was moved onto the grounds of the new church in 1941. The one-story structure has a gabled roof and is covered in wooden siding.

The main portion of the building houses a single large room which was former used as the sanctuary. The space retains its original pressed tin ceiling, cornice, and pews. The former choir loft has been boarded up with plywood. A ground-level door was added to the front of the building after the structure was moved to its new location in 1941 to provide access to the basement, which contains a kitchen and fellowship area. An addition on the back of the building contains restrooms.

References

 

Roman Catholic churches completed in 1905
Roman Catholic churches completed in 1929
20th-century Roman Catholic church buildings in the United States
Churches on the National Register of Historic Places in Nebraska
Gothic Revival church buildings in Nebraska
Buildings and structures in Custer County, Nebraska
Churches in the Roman Catholic Diocese of Grand Island
National Register of Historic Places in Custer County, Nebraska
Houses on the National Register of Historic Places in Nebraska
1905 establishments in Nebraska